Alessandro Minelli may refer to: 
Alessandro Minelli (biologist), Italian biologist and professor emeritus of zoology at the University of Padova
Alessandro Minelli (footballer, born 1970), Swiss football defender
Alessandro Minelli (footballer, born 1999), Italian football player